The rectus capitis anterior (rectus capitis anticus minor) is a short, flat muscle, situated immediately behind the upper part of the Longus capitis.

It arises from the anterior surface of the lateral mass of the atlas, and from the root of its transverse process, and passing obliquely upward and medialward, is inserted into the inferior surface of the basilar part of the occipital bone immediately in front of the foramen magnum.

action: aids in flexion of the head and the neck;
nerve supply: C1, C2.

Additional images

References

External links

 PTCentral

Muscles of the head and neck